Crubeen, formerly The Longkesh Ramblers, was a 1970s Irish folk band from Newry, County Down, Northern Ireland.

Background and recording
Crubeen recorded and produced all their material in Dublin.

Crubeen released their debut album Eagle's Whistle in 1976 with EMI Ireland and followed it up by another album with the simple title Crubeen in 1978, released by CBS records. They also featured on a number of compilations albums Best of Irish Folk, alongside The Sands Family and Planxty.

Personnel
Crubeen
Benny McKay: bodhran and vocal
Eddie Ruddy: flute, whistle and concertina
Barney Gribbon: banjo, mandolin, concertina and harmonica
Tommy Hollywood: guitar, mandolin and vocal
Paddy Clerkin: vocals, guitar, double bass, five string banjo
John Waterson: fiddle, viola, dulcimer
Billy Fegan: tin whistle, harmonica and vocal

Production team
Leo O'Kelly – production
Bob Harper – engineering
Ronnie Norton – cover design & photography

Discography
Source: The Irish Music Review

Eagle' Whistle (1976, LP, EMI, Ireland)
Crubeen (1978, LP, CBS Records, Ireland)

Crubeen featured on compilation albums

The Best Of Irish Folk see it here 
Label:  EMI
Catalogue Number: # PCD-2059 LP
1977—EMI PCD-2059 LP

Best of Irish Folk
Label:	One Up
Catalogue Number: # OU 2180
16 Track Compilation Featuring Crubeen, Sands Family, Gemma Hasson, Planxty, Aileach & Blacksmiths

The best of Irish Folk - album ( 1980 )
Label:  Peters International Records
Catalogue Number:# PLD 2059

References

Musical groups from County Down
Folk music groups from Northern Ireland